Thomas A. Hanlon (born August 21, 1945) is an American politician who was a member of the Oregon House of Representatives.  He worked in the fishery industry.

References

1945 births
Living people
Democratic Party members of the Oregon House of Representatives
People from Hempstead (village), New York
People from Clatsop County, Oregon
American fishers